Isobel (or Isobella) Gunn (1 August 1781 – 7 November 1861), also known as John Fubbister or Mary Fubbister, was a Scottish labourer employed by the Hudson's Bay Company (HBC), noted for having passed herself off as a man, thereby becoming the first European woman to travel to Rupert's Land, now part of Western Canada.

Early life 

Gunn was born in Orphir on the Orkney Islands off the north coast of Scotland, near the town of Kirkwall. She was the daughter of John Gunn and Margaret Leask. Little is known of her early life until the summer of 1806, when, under the pseudonym John Fubbister, she entered into a contract with the HBC as a labourer for three years at £8 per year. Although her motivations for doing so are uncertain, tradition holds that she may have been following a lover who had cast her aside. Her brother George was also employed by the HBC, and it is also possible that she was enticed to join by his stories of adventure. Modern commentators point out that the modest HBC salary was nevertheless more than Gunn could have earned as a woman in Orkney at that time. Official HBC policy forbade employment of European women, although First Nation women were employed as cooks and domestic servants in company outposts.

Discovery and return to Scotland 

Once again, Gunn worked unsuspected alongside the men. The pretence was maintained until the morning of 29 December 1807, when to general astonishment, Gunn gave birth to a baby boy at the home of Alexander Henry the younger, the chief of the North West Company's Pembina post. According to Henry's journal: 

The father of the baby was reportedly John Scarth, an HBC employee who had been in frequent contact with Gunn. After being found out, Gunn became known as Mary Fubbister, and in early 1808 was ordered to return to Albany, and upon her arrival was no longer allowed to work with the men, but rather offered work as a washerwoman.  Against her wishes, Gunn and her child were returned to Scotland on the Prince of Wales on 20 September 1809.  There, she lived in poverty, working as a stocking and mitten maker until her death.

Legacy 

Isobel Gunn's life has subsequently become the basis for a work of historical fiction by author Audrey Thomas, a documentary poem entitled The Ballad of Isabel Gunn by Stephen Scobie, and the subject of a documentary film entitled The Orkney Lad: The Story of Isabel Gunn, directed by filmmaker Anne Wheeler. Canadian folk singer Eileen McGann also paid tribute with her ballad 'Isabella Gunn'.

See also 
Marie-Anne Gaboury, the first woman of European descent to permanently settle in Rupert's Land.

References 

Henry, Alexander: The Journal of Alexander Henry The Younger 1799-1814, Toronto: Champlain Society, 1988 
Van Kirk, Sylvia: Many Tender Ties: Women in Fur-Trade Society, 1670-1870, Winnipeg: Watson and Dwyer, 1980 
 Scobie, Stephen: The Ballad of Isabel Gunn Kingston, ON: Quarry, 1987 
 Thomas, Audrey: Isobel Gunn, Toronto: Penguin Canada, 2000

External links 
 
 A biography from the Hudson's Bay Company
 How "John Fubbister" was discovered
 Isobel Gunn at orkneyjar
 at "Undiscovered Scotland"

Canadian fur traders
1781 births
1861 deaths
People from Orkney
Female-to-male cross-dressers
19th-century Canadian LGBT people
Scottish expatriates in Canada
19th-century Scottish businesspeople
19th-century British businesswomen